Madagascar has diplomatic relations with many countries, both individual bilateral relations and by virtue of its membership of African and other regional blocs. International aid has been received from the IMF and the World Bank, and a national environmental plan supported by the World Bank and USAID began in 1990.

Regional relations

Madagascar historically has remained outside the mainstream of African affairs, although it is a member of the Indian Ocean Commission, the Organization of African Unity (now renamed the AU), the Port Management Association of Eastern and Southern Africa (PMAESA), and the Non-Aligned Movement. Madagascar was admitted to the Southern African Development Community in 2004.

Bilateral relations
Active diplomatic relationships are maintained with Europe, especially the UK, France, Germany, Italy and Switzerland, as well as with Russia, Japan, South Korea, India, Indonesia, Egypt and China. Madagascar also maintains good relations with the United States.

International agencies being present in the country allows to react quickly to emergencies such as a food crisis.

Africa

Americas

Asia

Europe

Oceania

International Aid

The World Bank had a $600 million commitment to Madagascar through 21 active International Development Association projects.

On June 23, 2000 the International Monetary Fund (IMF) approved a $41 million disbursement of its new three-year $141 million Poverty Reduction and Growth Facility. This money is intended to secure Malagasy credit, and to cover additional financing gaps caused by recent natural disasters.

In 2003, the World Bank released more than $100 million in poverty reduction aid in response to Madagascar's efforts to stop corruption. Then, in October 2004, the International Monetary Fund and the World Bank said they would write off $2 billion in debt—almost half Madagascar's total debt.

In March 2005, Madagascar was the first beneficiary of development aid offered by the United States in a plan aimed at rewarding countries determined by Washington to be putting forth market reforms and advocating democracy.

Further debt relief constituted another infusion of favorable developments for Madagascar when on June 11, 2005, at a pre-G8 summit meeting in London, world leaders agreed to write off $40 billion in debt owed by the world's poorest countries. Under the plan, the World Bank, the International Monetary Fund and the African Development Fund would write off 100 percent of the money owed to them by 18 countries

Madagascar and international aid for the environment

Since the mid-1980s, the donor community, led by the World Bank and the USAID, has recognized that Madagascar is one of the world's most unusual natural wonders. As such, it has invested substantially in Malagasy conservation efforts. At $18 million per annum, the environment program of USAID-Madagascar is the second largest American program in Madagascar, and one of the largest programs of its kind in the world. The World Bank further supported this environmental effort with an additional $180 million. Other bilateral donors including France, Germany and others have funded specific project initiatives in coordination with the World Bank and the USAID.

Eighty percent of the flora and fauna are endemic. The problem recognized by the international community is that this unique and valuable land has proven fragile. The bulk of the rainforests have already been destroyed causing significant erosion and a threat to water sources in arid areas. The international community has recognized this environmental catastrophe in progress and has responded in force by supporting and guiding the Malagasy government in its conservation program. Research has demonstrated that "tavy", a form of slash and burns agriculture, has been the largest contributor to environmental degradation in Madagascar. As a result, the 1990s have seen both a prohibition on tavy in many places and an acceleration in the creation of national parks and protected areas that are off limits to agriculture. The goal has been to establish more than 50 such parks and protected areas in a 15-year period.

While Madagascar's conservation crisis remains severe, its economic situation is also grave. With a population that is more than 80 percent agrarian, limiting resource through the creation of parks and farming restrictions is economically devastating to a significant percentage of the rural population. The need for economic development is thus exacerbated by the rapid growth of environmental policies and institutions.

National Environmental Action Plan

The USAID and the World Bank worked together with the Malagasy government in the late 1980s to try to find a way to reconcile these two difficult and seemingly mutually-exacerbating problems. The result of these discussions was the creation of the Malagasy Office of the Environment and the signing of a National Environmental Action Plan.

The National Environmental Action Plan is intended to be implemented in three phases. The first phase of Madagascar's Environment Plan (EP1, 1990–1996) was marked by the creation of Integrated Conservation and Development Projects (ICDP). These ICDPs were intended to offer farmers economic alternatives ecologically unsound environmental practices. This phase also focused on establishing an institutional environment. The USAID funded the creation of the ANGAP (National Association for the Management of Protected Areas - the national park service), employing consultants to model an institutional structure based upon a modified version of the South African and American national parks and protected areas systems.

The second phase (1997–2002) focuses on the implementation of a larger "landscape approach" to conservation and development, and the transference of conservation and development project ownership from international non-government organizations to the Malagasy national parks association (ANGAP). The focus of the third phase (2003–2008) is not yet clarified, but will require the completion of the indigenization process and the withdrawal of foreign economic support.

Early evaluations of the donor programs have criticized the integrated conservation and development approach for paying no more than lip service to development. Biological conservation has been prioritized at the cost of local livelihoods. Further, the development initiatives that have been implemented are not well integrated. Most local recipients of development aid do not connect the aid to the agricultural and land restrictions. Local animosity towards these programs is thus commonly high.

See also
 List of diplomatic missions in Madagascar
 List of diplomatic missions of Madagascar
 Visa policy of Madagascar

References

External links
Ministry of Foreign Affairs of Madagascar  (French)